Astronomy North is a Canadian astronomical society for auroras. They collaborate with the project Aurora Max and the Canadian Space Agency.

Website 
The website of Astronomy North contains important information for amateur astronomers. These amateur astronomers can watch the auroras, the sunspots and the weather with simple scientific coordinates.

See also 
 List of astronomical societies

References

External links
 https://web.archive.org/web/20101227070816/http://astronomynorth.com/about-us/

 

Astronomy organizations
Amateur astronomy organizations
Learned societies of Canada
Astronomy in Canada